Let's Be Friends is a 2005 French film directed and written by Olivier Nakache & Éric Toledano.

Synopsis
Thirty-year-old computer scientist, physicist, bachelor, sickly shy and hypochondriac, Claude Mandelbaum leads a life all the more dull that his last, and only, love story goes back two years. One day, on the occasion of the marriage of his best friend, Daniel, he meets Serge, a divorced fifty-year-old who takes full advantage of his celibacy by chaining the adventures. Shortly after, on the advice of Daniel, Claude resolved to make an appointment in a marriage agency of a particular kind, where it is the women who contact the men. In the waiting room, he falls face to face with Serge, who invites him to have a drink in his home ...

Cast

 Jean-Paul Rouve as Claude Mendelbaum
 Gérard Depardieu as Serge
 Annie Girardot as Madame Mendelbaum
 Lionel Abelanski as Daniel
 Isabelle Renauld as Sophie
 Yves Jacques as Germain
 Valérie Benguigui as Eva
 Jonathan Lambert as Totof
 Élisabeth Vitali as Véronique
 Xavier De Guillebon as Philippe
 Mar Sodupe as Julia Marquez
 Flore Grimaud as Sylvie
 Caroline Frank as Manon
 Tilly Mandelbrot as Pauline
 Cassandra Harrouche as Justine
 Virginie Caliari as Barbara
 Mimi Félixine as Latifah
 Thierry Godard as Mathias
 Frédéric Maranber as Jean-Mi
 Jacqueline Staup as Tata Muguette
 Catherine Hosmalin as Woman speed dating

See also
 2005 in film

References

External links 
 

2005 comedy films
2005 films
French comedy films
Films directed by Olivier Nakache and Éric Toledano
Films scored by Bruno Coulais
2000s French films